Connie's Country is the twelfth studio album by American country singer Connie Smith. It was released in April 1969 via RCA Victor and contained 12 tracks. The pop-inspired project included a mixture of original and cover songs. The album's cover of Gordon Lightfoot's "Ribbon of Darkness" was released as a single, reaching the top 20 of the American country songs chart. The album itself would place in the top 20 of the American country albums chart. It was met with favorable reviews following its release.

Background
Connie Smith had a string of uninterrupted top ten country singles during the 1960s, launched by 1964's "Once a Day". The song topped the country songs chart for eight weeks and launched her career. In 1968, Smith became a Christian which affected her many of the recordings during her time with her label, RCA Victor. She began incorporating more gospel songs into her regular studio albums, which would reflect in Smith's 1969 album. Smith went into recording sessions to make her next album, Connie's Country in 1968. Biographer Barry Mazor notes that "despite the title" the sort of pop music that "Ms. Smith found most agreeable".

Recording and content
The recordings for Connie's Country were taken from sessions held between February 1967 and December 1968. The sessions took place at RCA Studio A, located in Nashville, Tennessee. The sessions were produced by Bob Ferguson. The album consisted of 12 tracks. With the album's pop influence, there was an emphasis on string instrumentation. Smith sought out direction from Brenton Banks, who led the string instrumentation for her sessions. The album mixed new recordings with covers of previously recorded country and pop material. 

One of the covers Smith cut for the album was "Ribbon of Darkness". Although written and first cut by Gordon Lightfoot, Smith recalled first hearing Marty Robbins's 1965 country single version. Smith also covered "Seattle", which was first recorded by Perry Como and appeared as the theme song to the television show Here Come the Brides. She also covered Merle Haggard's country selection "Today I Started Loving You Again". Several new tracks were also part of the album. Of these new songs was "Sound of Different Drums", which was composed by Harlan Howard. Also included was "A Lonely Woman", which was composed by Jean Chapel and Alda Calongne. Smith also cut the Ben Peters-penned "Happy Street", which Mazor described as a "giddy" song as compared to the rest of the album. As part of Smith's vow to record one gospel track per studio album, she cut one of her favorite hymns called "Gathering Flowers for the Master's Bouquet".

Release and reception

Connie's Country was originally released in April 1969 on the RCA Victor label. It was the twelfth studio collection released in Smith's career. The album was distributed as a vinyl LP, containing six songs on either side of the record. Decades later, the album was re-released on Sony Music Entertainment to digital and streaming sites. The album received a positive review from Billboard magazine, which praised Smith's reading of "Ribbon of Darkness". The magazine also highlighted "The Sound of Different Drums", "Blue Little Girl" and "Got a Lotta Blues to Lose". AllMusic gave it 4.5 out of 5 stars. In its original release, Connie's Country spent 15 weeks on the American Billboard Top Country Albums chart, peaking at number 14 in June 1969. Smith's version of "Ribbon of Darkness" was issued as a single in February 1969 by RCA Victor. The single spent 14 weeks on the Billboard Hot Country Songs chart and peaked at number 13 in October 1969. It was Smith's second top 20 single in her career.

Track listings

Vinyl version

Digital version

Personnel
All credits are adapted from the liner notes of Connie's Country and the biography booklet by Barry Mazor titled Just for What I Am.

Musical personnel
 Byron Bach – cello
 Brenton Banks – violin
 Howard Carpenter – viola
 Jerry Carrigan – drums
 Dorothy Dillard – background vocals
 Ray Edenton – guitar
 Johnny Gimble – fiddle
 Solie Fott – violin
 Buddy Harman – drums
 Priscilla Hubbard – background vocals
 Lillian Hunt – violin
 Roy Huskey – bass
 Charles Justice – fiddle
 Martin Katahn – violin

 John Kline – viola
 Shelly Kurland – violin
 Charlie McCoy – electric bass, harmonica
 Piere Menard – violin
 Weldon Myrick – steel guitar
 Louis Nunley – background vocals
 Dean Porter – guitar
 Hargus "Pig" Robbins – piano
 Connie Smith – lead vocals
 Roby Story – violin
 Leo Taylor – drums
 Gary Vanosdale – viola
 Bill Walker – vibes
 Lamar Watkins – guitar
 Harvey Wolfe – cello
 William Wright – background vocals

Technical personnel
 Brenton Banks – Arranger
 Jesse Burt – Liner Notes
 Bob Ferguson – Producer
 Milton Henderson – Technician
 Al Pachucki – Engineer
 Roy Shockley – Technician
 Bill Walker – Arranger, conductor

Chart performance

Release history

References

Footnotes

Books

 

1969 albums
Albums produced by Bob Ferguson (music)
Connie Smith albums
RCA Victor albums